Leo W. Buss (born 1953) is a retired Professor at Yale University's departments of geology, geophysics, and ecology and evolutionary biology.

Life
He graduated from Johns Hopkins University with a B.A., M.A., and Ph.D in 1979.

His evolutionary developmental biology book approaches the subject of the evolution of metazoan development from a cell lineage selection point of view.
He reevaluates August Weismann's model of the cell compartmentalization of somatic and germline cell lineages (see Weismann barrier), and argues that the vision of the individual taken by the modern synthesis is insufficient to explain the early evolution of development or ontogeny.

He collaborated with Walter Fontana in producing some of the first papers on artificial chemistries.

Works
 The Evolution of Individuality, Princeton University Press, 1987, 
"Beyond Digital Naturalism", Artificial life: an overview, Editor Christopher G. Langton, MIT Press, 1997, 
"What would be conserved "If the tape were played twice?"", Complexity: metaphors, models, and reality, Editors George A. Cowan, David Pines, David Elliott Meltzer, Westview Press, 1999, 
"Growth by Intussusception in Hyrdactiniid Hydroids", Evolutionary patterns: growth, form, and tempo in the fossil record in honor of Allan Cheetham, Editors Alan H. Cheetham, Jeremy B. C. Jackson, Scott Lidgard, Frank Kenneth McKinney, University of Chicago Press, 2001,

References

External links
"Leo W. Buss", Scientific Commons

1953 births
Living people
Evolutionary biologists
MacArthur Fellows
Yale University faculty
Researchers of artificial life